Lyulin Peak is a sharp double peak forming the east extremity of Delchev Ridge and Tangra Mountains, eastern Livingston Island in the South Shetland Islands, Antarctica.  The peaks rise to approximately 200 m, have rocky, ice-free slopes and surmount Renier Point.  The peaks are named after Lyulin Mountain in Bulgaria.

Location

Maps
 L.L. Ivanov et al. Antarctica: Livingston Island and Greenwich Island, South Shetland Islands. Scale 1:100000 topographic map. Sofia: Antarctic Place-names Commission of Bulgaria, 2005.
 L.L. Ivanov. Antarctica: Livingston Island and Greenwich, Robert, Snow and Smith Islands. Scale 1:120000 topographic map.  Troyan: Manfred Wörner Foundation, 2009.

References
 Lyulin Peak. SCAR Composite Antarctic Gazetteer
 Bulgarian Antarctic Gazetteer. Antarctic Place-names Commission. (details in Bulgarian, basic data in English)

External links
 Lyulin Peak. Copernix satellite image

Tangra Mountains